Tera is a Chadic dialect cluster spoken in north-eastern Nigeria in the north and eastern parts of Gombe State and Borno State. Blench (2006) believes Pidlimdi (Hinna) dialect is a separate language.

Varieties
Blench lists these language varieties as part of the Tera language cluster.

Nyimatli
Pidlimdi
Bura Kokura

Origin of Tera (Nyimalti)
Kuji Hamidu Bukar, the Chief of Liji, noted that Nyimalti tribe migrated from Yemen in Arabian Peninsula together with other tribes like the Babur, Jukun, Bokewa, Jara, Margi, Tangale, Tula, Waja, Kanuri, Kanakuru, and Kare-Kare around 8th century AD. They sojourned through the route of lake Chad basin down to Buma on the Hawul river that joined the Gongola River valley. They moved northward and left some of their kiths and kins at Kanakuru, Dali, Gol, Kukal, Gasi, Kwata Tera, Wuyo, Balbiya, Ngazargamu and Shani to settle in Shinga. While some settled on the way during the long journey, some proceeded in search for greener pasture for their livestock, farm land and possibly a habitable place to practice their cultural heritage.

From Shinga, it was gathered that some Nyimalti groups dispersed along several routes; some moved  Eastward to Wade, some Northward to establish Bage, Gwani, Difa, Kinafa, Difa, Lubo and Kwali, some Westward to establish Liji, Kwadon, Kurba and southward to found Deba, Kalshingi, Jagali, Zambuk, Panda and Pata.

Phonology

 Voiceless plosives are lightly aspirated but unreleased before another consonant.
  and  formally had  and  respectively as allophones but the two pairs have split; however, the alveolar plosives never precede front vowels and the postalveolar affricates rarely precede anything but front vowels.
  is a relatively new phoneme, appearing in loanwords from English and Hausa.
  derives from a  that has lost its alveolar contact while retaining the palatal and glottal action.

 The mid vowels  are true-mid .
 The open vowels  are central .

Vowel length contrasts are neutralized in monosyllabic words with no coda consonants.

Diphthongs, which have the same length as long vowels, consist of a non-high vowel and a high vowel:

Tone
Tera is a tonal language, distinguishing high, mid and low tone.  Tone is not indicated orthographically since no minimal trios exist; minimal pairs can be distinguished by context.

Orthography
The first publication in Tera was Labar Mbarkandu nu Yohanna Bula Ki, a translation of the Gospel of John, which established an orthographic system.  In 2004, this orthographic system was revised.

References

Bibliography

 

Biu-Mandara languages
Languages of Nigeria